The Radical Party of Chile, is a classical radical political party in Chile. This party has been referred to as a liberal, a social-liberal, and a social-democrat.

The party was founded as the Social Democrat Radical Party on 18 August 1994 out of a union between the Radical Party and the Social Democracy Party, both of which had received poor results in the parliamentary elections. The party re-adopted its historic name in 2018.

The party supported Ricardo Lagos in the 1999–2000 presidential elections, who won 48.0% in the first round and was elected with 51.3% in the second round. At the 2001 legislative elections, the party won as part of the Concertación six out of 120 seats in the Chamber of Deputies and no seats in the Senate. This changed at the 2005 legislative elections to seven and one, respectively. In 2009, it won five congress seats and one senate seat.

The party is a member of Socialist International and participant in the Permanent Conference of Political Parties of Latin America and the Caribbean.

Executive board 
The current party executive assumed in August 2018.

Leaders of the PR (1994–present)

Election results 
Due to its membership in the Concert of Parties for Democracy, the party has endorsed the candidates of other parties on several occasions. Presidential elections in Chile are held using a two-round system, the results of which are displayed below.

Presidential elections

See also 
 Liberalism and radicalism in Chile
 List of political parties in Chile

References 

 Attribution

Further reading 
 Arundel, Dietmar (2013). Over the Edge: Leftpopulists in the Early 21st Century in Latin America. North Dakota State University Press.

External links 
 Official website

1994 establishments in Chile
Full member parties of the Socialist International
Liberal parties in Chile
Political parties established in 1994
Radical parties in Chile
Radical Party of Chile
Social liberal parties
Social democratic parties